Orguse is a village in Väike-Maarja Parish, Lääne-Viru County, in northeastern Estonia.

The Simuna meteorite crater is located in this village. Reportedly, it was formed on 1 June 1937, when one part of the blasted bolide fell into the ground.

References

Villages in Lääne-Viru County